Henry E. Williams Jr. (January 20, 1917 – February 8, 2002) was an American professional golfer who played on the PGA Tour in the 1950s and 1960s.

Williams was born in Reading, Pennsylvania. Like most professional golfers of his generation, Williams earned his living primarily as a club professional. Williams was a pro at the Tully-Secane Country Club in Secane, Pennsylvania. From 1951 to 1975, he was the head pro at the Berkleigh Country Club near Kutztown, Pennsylvania about halfway between Allentown and Reading. From 1976 until his retirement in 1993, he was head pro at Moselem Springs Country Club. He lived most of his adult life in Fleetwood, Pennsylvania.

Williams won once on the PGA Tour, the 1952 Tucson Open. His best finish in a major championship was runner-up at the 1950 PGA Championship. He was defeated by Chandler Harper (4 & 3) in the match play final. The tournament was held at Scioto Country Club in Columbus, Ohio. He was noted for excellence in the green-to-tee ball striking phase of the game, but was reputed to be a lousy putter.

Williams, a life member of the PGA of America, was inducted into the Berks County Hall of Fame in 1985 and the Pennsylvania Hall of Fame in 2001. He was also a member of the Philadelphia Section PGA Hall of Fame.

Professional wins

PGA Tour wins (1)
1952 Tucson Open

Other wins (9)
1949 Philadelphia PGA Championship
1951 Philadelphia Open Championship
1953 Philadelphia PGA Championship
1954 Pennsylvania Open Championship
1955 Philadelphia Open Championship
1958 Philadelphia PGA Championship
1962 Pennsylvania Open Championship, Jamaica Open
1968 Salisbury (Maryland) Open

References

American male golfers
PGA Tour golfers
Golfers from Pennsylvania
Sportspeople from Reading, Pennsylvania
1917 births
2002 deaths